Claude Péloquin (1942 – 25 November 2018) was a Québécois poet, writer, singer, songwriter, screenwriter, and director.

Péloquin published more than twenty books of poetry.  He was also the author of many popular songs, including Robert Charlebois' Lindberg, for which he won the Félix Award in 1969.

References

1942 births
2018 deaths
Writers from Quebec
20th-century Canadian poets
Canadian male poets
Canadian songwriters
Canadian male novelists
Canadian poets in French
Canadian novelists in French
20th-century Canadian male writers
Deaths from cancer in Quebec
French Quebecers